Madrid is the capital of Spain.

It can also refer to:

Other places

Spain
Community of Madrid, an autonomous community of Spain
Madrid (Spanish Congress Electoral District), a Spanish Parliament constituency

Colombia
Madrid, Colombia

Mexico
Madrid, Colima

Philippines
Madrid, Surigao del Sur, a municipality

United States
Madrid, Alabama
Madrid, Colorado
Madrid, Iowa
Madrid, Maine
Madrid, Nebraska
Madrid, New Mexico
Madrid, New York
Madrid (CDP), New York

People
Andrés Madrid, Argentine footballer
José Fernández Madrid, politician, physician, scientist and writer closely associated with the United Provinces of New Grenada
Juan Madrid, Spanish writer
Miguel de la Madrid, President of Mexico (1982–88)
Patricia Madrid, New Mexico Attorney General and congressional candidate

Other uses
The Madrid system for the international registration of trademarks
14967 Madrid, an asteroid
 Madrid, 1987, a Spanish drama film directed by David Trueba
Madrid (band)
Real Madrid C.F., a football team based in Madrid, Spain
Atlético de Madrid, better known as Atlético Madrid, a football team based in Madrid, Spain

See also
New Madrid (disambiguation)
Madriz (disambiguation), a Spanish surname and Nicaraguan place name
Madridejos (disambiguation), a Spanish and Philippines place name